The Schroeder Bros. Meat Market  is a historic building located in the West End of Davenport, Iowa, United States. The Commercial Vernacular style building was complete in 1905 and it has been listed on the National Register of Historic Places since 1983.

History
The building was probably built for Henry and John Schroeder for their meat market. Another building that housed a cigar factory and residence occupied this property previously. Since at least the latter part of the 20th-century, the building has housed a tavern in the commercial space.

Architecture
The building is a two-story brick structure that sits at the corner of West Third and North Pine Streets. The entrance into the first-floor commercial space faces the corner. Above the entrance is a pressed-metal oriel window, which gives the building a sense of prominence. Another oriel window is located further back along North Pine Street. The second floor also features rectangular windows with hoods above them. The building has a cornice across the top.

References

Commercial buildings completed in 1905
Commercial architecture in Iowa
Vernacular architecture in Iowa
Buildings and structures in Davenport, Iowa
Commercial buildings on the National Register of Historic Places in Iowa
National Register of Historic Places in Davenport, Iowa
1905 establishments in Iowa